da Fonseca is a surname of Portuguese and later also Spanish origin. A feudal lordship name from a place named for a spring that dried up during the summer months, it comes from Latin fons sicca, meaning "dry well". The name is also common among Sephardic Jews.

Fonseca or Fonseka may refer to:

People
 Alonso III Fonseca (1475–1534), Galician archbishop and politician
 Andrea Fonseka, Malaysian actor, television presenter and model and winner of Miss Malaysia Universe 2004 
 Angelo da Fonseca (1902–1967), Indian artist
 Bruno Fonseca (1958–1994), American painter and sculptor
 Carlo Fonseka (1933–2019), Sri Lankan medical academic
 Carlos Fonseca Amador (1936–1976), Nicaraguan founder of the Sandinistas
 Carlos Fonseca (boxer) (born 1955), Brazilian boxer
 Carolyn De Fonseca (1929–2009), American film and voice actress
 Casto Fonseca (1800–1845), Nicaraguan military dictator
 Celso Fonseca (born 1956), Brazilian samba, bossa nova and música popular brasileira guitarist and vocalist
 Cholomondeley de Fonseka Goonewardene (1917-2006), Sri Lankan Sinhala Trotskyist politician
 Cleonâncio Fonseca (1936–2021), Brazilian politician
 Daniel Fonseca (born 1969), Uruguayan football (soccer) player
 Daniel de Fonseca (1672–), Jewish court physician and courtier in Europe
 Daniele Fonseca, birth name of Italian unification leader Daniele Manin (1804–1857)
 Danny Fonseca (born 1979), Costa Rican football (soccer) player
 David Fonseca (born 1973), Portuguese singer
 Deodoro da Fonseca (1827–1892), first President of the Republic of Brazil
 Duduka da Fonseca (born 1951), Brazilian jazz drummer and band leader
 Édgar Fonseca (born 1981), Colombian road cyclist
 Edison Fonseca (born 1984), Colombian football (soccer) player
 Eleonora Fonseca Pimentel (1751–1799), Neapolitan poet and revolutionary
 Eugene Reginald de Fonseka (died 2003), puisne judge of the Supreme Court of Sri Lanka
 Flor Isava Fonseca (1921–2020), Venezuelan sportswoman and writer
 Francisco Fonseca (born 1979), Mexican football (soccer) player
 Fumilay Fonseca (born 1988), São Toméan race walker
 Gamini Fonseka (1936–2004), Sri Lankan film actor and politician
 Gampalage Shehan Naveendra De Fonseka Gunawarna Jayasuriya, full name of Sri Lankan cricketer Shehan Jayasuriya (born 1991)
 Gonzalo Fonseca (1922–1997), Uruguayan sculptor
 Graciano Fonseca (born 1974), Colombian road cyclist
 Hermes Rodrigues da Fonseca (1855–1923), President of Brazil
 Isaac Aboab da Fonseca (1605–1693), rabbi, scholar, kabbalist and writer in Europe and South America
 Isabel Fonseca (born 1961), American writer
 J. P. de Fonseka (1897–1948), Sri Lankan essayist
 Juan Fernando Fonseca (born 1979), Colombian singer better known under his stage name Fonseca
 Juan Rodríguez de Fonseca, (1451–1524), Spanish archbishop, courtier and bureaucrat
 Lew Fonseca (1899–1989), American baseball player
 Lidia Fonseca (born 1969), Executive Vice President, Chief Digital & Technology Officer at Pfizer Inc.
 Luis Fonseca (runner) (born 1977), Venezuelan long-distance runner
 Luis Fonseca (United States Navy) (born 1980), a United States Navy hospital corpsman and hero of the Iraq War
 Luis Fonseca (weightlifter) (born 1949), Costa Rican weightlifter
 Lyndsy Fonseca (born 1987), American television and film actress
 Malini Fonseka, Sri Lankan film actress
 Mary L. Fonseca (1915–2005), American politician and Massachusetts state senator
 Mervyn Fonseka (1897–1946), Sri Lankan lawyer
 Mohotti Arachchilage Sriyani Kulawansa-Fonseca, full name of Sri Lankan Olympic hurdler Sriyani Kulawansa (born 1970)
 Paulo Fonseca (born 1973), Portuguese football (soccer) manager
 Peter Fonseca (born 1966), Canadian politician
 Ramón Fonseca Mora (born 1952), Panamanian novelist and attorney
 Ray Fonseca (1953–2010), American professional hula dancer
 Roberto Fonseca (born 1975), Cuban jazz pianist
 Roberto Fonseca (football manager) (born 1962), Brazilian football manager
 Rolando Fonseca (born 1974), Costa Rican football (soccer) player
 Sarath Fonseka (born 1950), Sri Lankan politician and senior military officer
 Susantha de Fonseka (1900–1963), Sri Lankan statesman
 Todd A. Fonseca (born 1966), American author of juvenile fiction
 M. Walter Fonseka Abeykoon, Sri Lanka Inspector-General of Police from 1959-1963
 Jahi Jouse Samir Fonseca (Born 2005) Honduran Shot-put and discus thrower

References

Portuguese-language surnames
Spanish-language surnames